Norsk Toppfotball (NTF) is an interest organization for the 16 Norwegian Premier League and 16 Adeccoligaen clubs in Norway. The organization was previously known as Serieforeningen av 1972 (SF-72), but changed its name in 2001. NTF goal is to be a leading factor in the development of Norwegian top football on a club level. They support clubs economically, administrative and commercially to help raise the level of Norwegian football. NTF, together with TV 2 and the coaches union, choose the coach of the month/year, and together with TV 2 and the readers of fxt.no choose the player of the month/year.

References

http://www.toppfotball.no

External links
Official website

Football in Norway